is a Japanese novel series written by Hideyuki Kikuchi and illustrated by Jun Suemi. The story takes place in Demon City Shinjuku'''s universe and features common characters.

Plot
As told in the events of Demon City Shinjuku, a devastating earthquake caused by supernatural forces left most of Japan in ruins, turning the Shinjuku district into a zone suspended between the mortal world and Hell. The district has become an isolated slum in which humans struggle to cohabit with monsters and demons every day. In this dark place, a young private investigator specialized in missing people, named Setsura Aki, gets routinely tasked with dangerous missions that pit him against the worst entities of the netherworld.

Characters

The protagonist of the story, the young, handsome owner of a senbei shop in West Shinjuku who moonlights as a private investigator. He specializes in missing person cases and is considered the best manhunter in the business, although he often finds himself forced to team up with Mephisto to solve his missions. He has two personalities, expressed distinctly as "boku" and "watashi", with the latter being much darker. His father, Renjo Aki, was a famous manhunter as well.

He is an expert in a wide variety of disciplines, including medicine, chemistry, history, technology and magic, to the point that he is rumored to be able to give life back to the dead (an ability he denies to have). Very much as Setsura, he is skilled at fighting with metal wires, and also utilizes traps and special concoctions. He hates women, though it is revealed he loved a vampire woman.

Mephisto originally appeared in Demon City Shinjuku, and also has his own stand alone novel in Demon Doctor Mephisto.

An obese information broker and shopkeeper. He often introduces Setsura to clients.

An old witch from Czech Republic living in the Takadanobaba. She has influence over the community of wizards and occultists of Shinjuku, and is aided by a doll girl and an intelligent crow created by her. Although she is a major character for most of the series, she is murdered during the Demon Princess arc while protecting Setsura.

Publication story
The series had its first installment published in 1986. It was divided in two blocks: the Nonnoberu short story collection and the longer Chohen arcs, both started the same year and finished in 2012. The latter's Demon Princess arc was published in English speaking countries by Digital Manga in 2009. Another episode of the series, Maohden, was published in 2012.

List of chaptersNonnoberu (April 1986, Shōdensha)
 (January 1989, Shōdensha)
 (July 1992, Shōdensha)
 (February 1993, Shōdensha)
 (July 1996, Shōdensha)
 (December 1998, Shōdensha)
 (July 1999, Shōdensha)
 (September 2001, Shōdensha)
 (May 2004, Shōdensha)
 (February 2007, Shōdensha)
 (September 2010, Shōdensha)
 (February 2012, Shōdensha)Chohen (May 1986, Shōdensha)
 (July 1986, Shōdensha)
 (September 1987, Shōdensha)
 (January 1988, Shōdensha,)
 (July 1989, Shōdensha)
 (October 1989, Shōdensha)
 (January 1990, Shōdensha)
 (July 1990, Shōdensha)
 (November 1990, Shōdensha)
 (April 1991, Shōdensha)
 (July 1991, Shōdensha)
 (January 1992, Shōdensha)

See alsoDemon City Shinjuku''
Hideyuki Kikuchi

References

Japanese serial novels
Shodensha franchises
Fantasy novel series
Post-apocalyptic literature
Vampire novels